Javanan-e Goruh (also Romanized as Javānān-e Gorūh, Javanan Gorooh, and Javānān Gorūh; also known as Gavan Gīrūh, Gavaneh Gīrveyā, Geviana Girvia, and Gevyana-Gireya) is a village in Arzil Rural District, Kharvana District, Varzaqan County, East Azerbaijan Province, Iran. At the 2006 census, its population was 44, in 10 families.

References 

Towns and villages in Varzaqan County